The 1917 Epping by-election was held on 28 June 1917.  The by-election was held due to the elevation of the incumbent Conservative MP, Amelius Lockwood.  The only candidate was the Conservative Richard Colvin, who was elected unopposed.

References

1917 in England
Epping Forest District
1917 elections in the United Kingdom
By-elections to the Parliament of the United Kingdom in Essex constituencies
Unopposed by-elections to the Parliament of the United Kingdom (need citation)
1910s in Essex